The February 15–20, 2021 North American winter storm, also unofficially referred to as Winter Storm Viola, was a significant and widespread snow and ice storm across much of the United States, Northern Mexico, and Southern Canada. The system started out as a winter storm on the West Coast of the United States on February 15, later moving southeast into the Southern Plains and Deep South from February 16–17. It then moved into the Appalachian Mountains and Northeastern United States, before finally moving out to sea on February 20. The storm subsequently became a powerful low pressure system over the North Atlantic, before eventually dissipating on February 26.

The system resulted in over 170 million people being placed under winter weather alerts, stretching from the West Coast to the East Coast. Over 4 million people lost power due to the storm, particularly in areas of the Deep South and interior Southeast. The system worsened the 2021 Texas power crisis, causing additional major damage to the Texas power grid just days after another destructive winter storm came through the area and hampering recovery efforts. It also contributed to a a historic cold wave that affected most of the Central United States. In total, the winter storm resulted in at least 29 fatalities, with 23 in the United States and six in Mexico. The system is estimated to have caused at least $2 billion (2021 USD) in damages, mainly due to blackouts and structural damage. Excluding the winter storm a few days previous to this storm, the system was the costliest winter storm in the United States since the March 1–3, 2018 nor'easter, and the deadliest since the Blizzard of 2016.

Meteorological history

Precipitation bands began developing with the system in portions of the Pacific Northwest, as well as the Rocky Mountains by 21:00 UTC that day. The frontal system then pushed eastward, and by 18:00 UTC on February 16, the system was crossing the Rocky Mountains, and fronts connected several low-pressures areas associated with the storm from north to south. Simultaneously, the main center of low pressure spawned several other low-pressure areas, while the storm began organizing. On February 17, the system developed a new low off the coast of Texas. A combination of a large trough in place over the Central United States, a large polar airmass being channeled southward, and moisture from the Gulf of Mexico caused snow and freezing rain to fall over the Southern States. For the next couple of days, the storm moved eastward while becoming elongated, before moving off the East Coast of the U.S. on February 19. However, the storm stalled off the East Coast of the U.S. for another day, bringing additional precipitation to the region, before finally beginning to move out to sea on February 20. The storm organized significantly and strengthened as it moved out into the Atlantic, with the storm's central pressure reaching  at 09:00 UTC on February 20. On February 22, the Free University of Berlin also gave the storm the name Dieter. Then, the cyclone gradually began to weaken, with the storm spawning a new low-pressure system to the northeast on February 24. Over the next couple of days, the storm rapidly weakened as it accelerated towards the northeast, before dissipating on February 26.

Preparations and impact

United States
Winter weather alerts were issued from February 14–15 in the Western United States, with Ice Storm Warnings being issued in portions of Oregon, due to a significant freezing rain threat, and Winter Storm Warnings were also issued in some of the mountainous regions. On February 16, Winter Storm Warnings were expanded into much of the Southern Plains and Deep South, and Winter Storm Watches were issued in parts of Mid-Atlantic and the Northeastern United States. On the next day, Winter Storm Watches in parts of the Northeast were upgraded to Winter Storm Warnings. In the entirety of the storm, over 170 million people were placed under some sort of winter weather alert, including over 120 million people under Winter or Ice Storm Warnings. In total, the storm left over 4 million people without power, making it one of the worst blackout events in the United States. In total, it killed at least 23 people in the United States, most of whom were in Texas.

Pacific Northwest
The system was the third winter storm to impact the Pacific Northwest with wintry weather in a week. Several inches of snow fell in Seattle, Washington, adding on to the totals from the previous storms. Further east in the mountain ranges, even higher totals were reported, with up to  falling in some areas. On February 15, I-90 was closed in both directions in Snoqualmie Pass due to heavy snow. Further south in Oregon, heavy freezing rain occurred from February 15–16, resulting in widespread impacts. Portland, Oregon recorded over half an inch of ice from the system, and some areas to the east reported even more. Over 730,000 people were left without power in Oregon, with over 200,000 in the Portland area alone. Some customers remained without power for over a week.

Southern Plains and Deep South

Due to the storm, Oklahoma City saw  of snow, Tulsa, Oklahoma picked up , and Dallas saw . Freezing rain was observed falling in Corpus Christi and Laredo as well. The freezing rain and snow from the system resulted in numerous structural collapses across parts of the Deep South. In Little Rock,  of snow fell, bringing the snow depth up to a record . Further south,  of snow fell, with snow depths of over  after the storm. A band of heavy snow set up on the back edge of the storm in southeastern Texas, with Del Rio picking up  of snow, breaking the 24-hour snowfall record there, which had not been broken since 1985.

Over 2.6 million people were left without power across the Deep South during the storm, adding to damage caused by the previous winter storm. In an animal sanctuary in San Antonio, over a dozen animals died during the storm. The deaths were blamed to heavy snow and extreme cold due to the winter storm. Several states in the Deep South cancelled COVID-19 vaccination shipments. In northwest Louisiana, major highways such as I-20 had to be closed due to heavy snow and ice from the storm. Five people were killed in Houston alone due to the wintry weather. Hundreds of thousands of people in Texas and bordering states were placed under boil water advisories during and right after the storm. Hundreds of crashes occurred on roadways across the region, with injuries and fatalities occurring as well. In Mississippi, lack of snow removal equipment resulted in snow and ice coating roadways for days after the storm. In Dallas, two ice hockey games between the Stars and the Tampa Bay Lightning scheduled for February 18 and 20 were postponed, due to the recent winter storms.

In Texas, the storm resulted in burst water pipes due to freezing rain, magnifying the damage from the previous winter storm. Further east, several businesses were forced to close in many locations, including Walmart, Publix, CVS, and Walgreens. Postal delivery services, such as UPS and FedEx, were also severely impacted, due to the major winter storm. In Texas, the National Weather Service office in Austin/San Antonio described the snow and ice from the system as the "worst of all winter events over the past week". The Texas government opened 300 warming shelters across the state during the winter storm. The heavy snowfall also broke several all-time records in the area, which had not been broken in decades. Despite Arkansas having more snowplows than states to the south, the snow removal vehicles were still unable to keep up with the heavy snowfall rates. The Arkansas Department of Transportation reported that nearly all of the state's roads were snow-covered at the peak of the storm. However, no traffic-related fatalities were reported, although injuries did occur. The government also put into effect rolling power outages after the storm.

In Jackson, Mississippi, freezing rain and sleet coated the roadways with ice, and numerous crashes resulted. It also left several drivers stranded for over 12 hours on the side of the roadways, before help arrived. In Louisiana, hundreds of car crashes occurred during the storm, with over 150,000 power outages being reported as well. Also, burst pipes became an issue due to freezing rain during the storm. Mississippi reported over 1,000 traffic accidents due to the system, and the governor reported that nearly the entire state faced issues due to the wintry weather. In northwestern Alabama, heavy snow and freezing rain resulted in roads becoming impassable. Several towns in the area were cut off from the big cities for over 2 days. In Florence, over 100 cars became stuck in a large pileup during the storm. Some of the snowfall and cold due to the storm rivaled similar occurrences during a similar wintry blast in 1989.

On February 18, the San Antonio Water System (SAWS) issue a boil-water notice for San Antonio, due to the power outages in Texas. On the same day, San Antonio firefighters fighting a large apartment fire caused by a water heater explosion were forced to use water trucks, as fire hydrants had become inoperable, due to water shortages. On February 18, the Oklahoma Department of Environmental Quality also issued boil-water recommendations for residents who experienced water service outages from the bitter temperatures and snowpack; Oklahoma City, Tulsa, and other cities (including Shawnee, Blackwell and Spencer) and rural water districts in the state issued temporary residential boil-water advisories or mandatory boil orders between February 18 and February 20.

In Kentucky, a man died after slipping on ice and then succumbing to hypothermia. The heavy snowfall disrupted FedEx operations at its Memphis hub, which hampered COVID-19 vaccine distribution nationally. On February 18, Memphis's public utility MLGW issued its first ever boil water order as water pressure levels dropped, affecting 260,000 households. The boil water order was lifted on February 25.

Eastern United States

After leaving the Deep South, the winter storm moved up the East Coast, becoming a nor'easter. Freezing rain resulted in hundreds of thousands of additional power outages in the area, which was still recovering from the previous week's ice storm. Virginia implemented a winter weather state of emergency effective February 12, due to the previous week's ice storm, which continued through this winter storm. Trees and power lines were downed, and customers who remained without power from the previous storm remained without power for a longer time.

The high water content of falling sleet and snow resulted in a danger of refreezing slush. Despite road crews working consistently on major highways, Virginia reported 385 crashes and 255 disabled vehicles statewide, and Maryland reported 160 crashes and 90 disabled vehicles. Several area COVID-19 vaccine clinics closed due to the treacherous conditions. The United States Government's Office of Personnel Management announced federal offices in the D.C. area were closed on February 18, and would open with a two-hour delay on February 19, although authorized remote work for the majority of employees continued. During the storm,  of snow fell in Norristown, Pennsylvania, northwest of Philadelphia. Over  of snow fell in southeastern Massachusetts, with  being reported in Dartmouth.

Snow and ice totals

Mexico
Heavy snow resulted in numerous road closures on highways, implemented to prevent accidents. Over 170 poor residents were being housed in hotels during the storm, including 70 immigrants. Six fatalities occurred due to the storm in northern Mexico, mostly due to carbon monoxide poisoning. One man died on the street due to exposure to wind, cold, and snow. On February 17, President Andrés Manuel López Obrador said that Mexico would increase usage of oil to produce electricity. He warned that on-and-off power outages from the storm would continue until February 21.

Canada
From February 18–20, light-to-moderate snow fell across parts of Eastern Canada from the system. A Winter Weather Travel Advisory was issued for parts of Ontario, and a few Snow Squall Warnings were issued for short bursts of heavy snow. Several centimeters of snow fell in much of the region, with up to  being reported in some areas.

See also

 2011 Groundhog Day blizzard
 December 2014 North American storm complex
 February 2021 North American ice storm
 February 13–17, 2021 North American winter storm
 List of major power outages

References

External links

 Archive of Storm Summaries from the Weather Prediction Center
 Event Review from the Weather Prediction Center

2020–21 North American winter
February 2021 events in North America
February 2021 events in the United States
Extratropical cyclones
Ice storms in the United States
Nor'easters
2021 natural disasters in the United States
2021 meteorology
Ice storms
Natural disasters in Texas